Saguaro Lake is the fourth reservoir on the Salt River, formed by the Stewart Mountain Dam in the U.S. state of Arizona. The lake is off State Route 87, about halfway between Phoenix and the ghost town of Sunflower.

This lake is within the Tonto National Forest; the facilities are managed by that authority.

A large fish kill was documented in the lake in 2022, believed to be due to golden algae.

Fishing

The lake is good for champion bass and carp fishing. Species that can be caught in the lake include:
 Rainbow trout
 Largemouth bass
 Smallmouth bass
 Yellow bass
 Crappie 
 Sunfish
 Channel catfish
 Walleye
 Tilapia
 Yellow perch
 Carp

References

External links

 Arizona Game and Fish Saguaro Lake Website
 Daily Water Level report from SRP
 Arizona Boating Locations Facilities Map
 Arizona Fishing Locations Map
 Video of Saguaro Lake

Reservoirs in Maricopa County, Arizona
Tonto National Forest
Reservoirs in Arizona